Guadalupe Ontiveros ( Moreno; September 17, 1942 – July 26, 2012) was an American actress best known for portraying Rosalita in The Goonies, and Yolanda Saldívar in the film Selena. She acted in numerous films and television shows, often playing a maid or, near the end of her career, an all-knowing grandmother. She was nominated for an Emmy Award for her work on Desperate Housewives and received critical acclaim for her role in Chuck & Buck, for which she won the National Board of Review award for Best Supporting Actress, and was also nominated for an Independent Spirit Award.

Early life 
Ontiveros was born in El Paso, Texas, the daughter of Luz "Lucita" Castañón and Juan Moreno, middle-class Mexican immigrants who overcame a lack of formal education to become owners of a tortilla factory and two restaurants in El Paso. She graduated from El Paso High School and went on to study at Texas Woman's University in Denton, Texas, where she received a bachelor's degree in social work. She was raised Roman Catholic.

After her marriage, she and her husband moved to California to realize his dream of starting an automotive business. During a period of dissatisfaction with her career as a social worker, Ontiveros was trying to decide whether to go back to school for a nursing degree when she saw an article about a need for local film extras. With her husband's encouragement, she took the job and parlayed it into a long stage and screen career. Prior to acting, she had worked for 18 years as a social worker, and she continued as an activist with many of the same causes with which she worked in that profession, such as domestic violence prevention and AIDS awareness and prevention.

Career

Film 
Ontiveros once estimated that she had played a maid at least 150 times on stage and screen; she wanted to see more diverse roles available to Latina actors, noting "I'm proud to represent those hands that labor in this country. I've given every maid I've ever portrayed soul and heart." In part because of her history in this role, she was chosen as the narrator for the documentary Maid in America.

One of Ontiveros' most prominent early movie roles was in the 1983 Gregory Nava film El Norte, in which she played a seamstress and maid who acts as mentor to a newly arrived immigrant girl from Guatemala. In a 2004 interview with the Dominican newspaper Listin Diario, she called El Norte "the film that always will remain in me... [it] tells the immigrants' story" when asked to name her favorite film from her long career. She played the housekeeper, Rosalita, a Spanish maid hired to assist in the packing and moving of the Walsh family in the hit adventure film The Goonies (1985) and a housekeeper in Dolly Dearest (1992). She also had a cameo appearance in Blood In Blood Out (1993) as Carmen, a
drug dealer who Paco (Benjamin Bratt) busts in an undercover cop sting while pretending to be a drug dealer.

Ontiveros worked with Nava in subsequent films, including My Family/Mi Familia (1995) and Selena (1997). In the latter film she portrayed Yolanda Saldívar, the murderer of Tejano superstar Selena. Long after film was released, she would still reportedly be "hissed" at by Selena fans when she was out in public. She also appeared in the Academy Award-winning film As Good as It Gets.

In 2000 she was featured in the film Chuck & Buck, in which she played Beverly, a tough theater director who puts on a play written by one of the film's main characters. She said in multiple interviews that she accepted the role even before seeing the script, solely on the basis of being asked to play a character who was not defined by Hispanic ethnicity. For that role, she was nominated for Best Supporting Actress in a Motion Picture at the 2000 Independent Spirit Awards.

Ontiveros, during her acting career participated in the web series Los Americans (2011), which is characterized by having a multigenerational focus, a middle-class family living in Los Angeles. During the series, she participated with Esai Morales, Tony Plana, Yvonne DeLaRosa, JC Gonzalez, Raymond Cruz and Ana Villafañe.

She co-starred with America Ferrera in the 2002 film Real Women Have Curves, as the overbearing mother of Ferrera's character. Her performance received excellent reviews and earned her and her co-star a Special Jury Prize at the prestigious Sundance Film Festival. She and Ferrera appeared together again in the family comedy Our Family Wedding. She continued to work in the studio and independent films, such as This Christmas in 2007 and My Uncle Rafael in 2012.

Television 
Ontiveros had a recurring role in the 2004–05 season of American prime time soap opera series Desperate Housewives as Juanita Solis, Gabrielle's suspicious mother-in-law. She received an Emmy nomination as Best Guest Actress in a Comedy Series for this role. In 2004 she also began a role as Abuela Elena, the grandmother of the title characters in the animated PBS children's series Maya & Miguel. The multicultural and bilingual series later introduced a deaf character, Marco, after a sign language-themed episode was suggested by the actress, who had two deaf adult sons.

She was a star of the short-lived the WB's Greetings from Tucson, playing the grandmother in an upwardly mobile family of mixed Irish and Mexican heritage. She also had recurring guest roles in the series Veronica's Closet, for which she won an ALMA Award in 1998, and in the short-lived soap opera Pasadena. She was a guest star in Hill Street Blues, Red Shoe Diaries, Resurrection Blvd., Cory in the House and King of the Hill, among many other series.

Stage 
After deciding she wanted an acting career, Ontiveros began in earnest, following up full-day sessions at her first career with evening work at Nosotros, a community theater in Los Angeles. In 1978 she was cast as Dolores in Luis Valdez's historic play Zoot Suit in her first major theatrical role. She went on to reprise the role on Broadway—it was the first Mexican American theatrical production ever to play there—and in the 1982 film version. She was a founding member of the Latino Theater Company.

Charity work 
In August 2006, the Kaiser Permanente insurance company announced that Ontiveros would be the featured presenter in a new health-education DVD to be available in English and Spanish. She promoted higher education for Latinos, through advertisements for the Hispanic Scholarship Fund in 2002 and through participation in a 2003 campaign to increase access to the 2004 Hispanic Scholarships Directory across southern California.

Personal life 
Ontiveros and her husband, Elías Ontiveros, had three sons, Alejandro, Elias, and Nicholas. They resided in Pico Rivera, California.

Death 
Ontiveros died on July 26, 2012, at Presbyterian Hospital in Whittier, California at the age of 69 after a battle with liver cancer. Her memorial was on August 2, 2012,  which was attended by her co-actors Eva Longoria, Edward James Olmos and Wilmer Valderrama. Her funeral was the following day, where her casket was transported and buried at Rose Hills Memorial Park in Whittier.

Filmography

Film

Television

References

External links 

1942 births
2012 deaths
American actresses of Mexican descent
American film actresses
American stage actresses
American television actresses
American voice actresses
American social workers
Actresses from El Paso, Texas
Texas Woman's University alumni
Deaths from cancer in California
Deaths from liver cancer
20th-century American actresses
21st-century American actresses
Burials at Rose Hills Memorial Park
American Roman Catholics